The Church of Saint Mary is a Grade I Listed Building in the town of Kidwelly, Carmarthenshire, Wales. The church was listed in December 1963 (Cadw Building ID: 11878). Founded c. 1114 the church was burnt down in 1223 and most of the existing building dates from c. 1320 when it was a Benedictine priory.

It has been listed as the largest parish church in south west Wales, exceptional for the broach spire and fine decorative 14th-century Gothic detail.

References

External links
Artwork at Church of Saint Mary, Kidwelly

Grade I listed churches in Carmarthenshire
14th-century church buildings in Wales
Saint Mary